Central Avenue School may refer to:

Central Avenue School (Lakeland, Florida), listed on the National Register of Historic Places (NRHP)
Central Avenue School (Anderson, Indiana), listed on the NRHP in Indiana